The Kenilworth is a luxury 12-floor co-operative apartment building in Manhattan on the Gold Coast of Central Park West, located at 151 Central Park West, at 75th Street. Named for the 12-century Kenilworth Castle, construction on the residential building was completed in 1908, and was designed in the French Second Empire-style by architects Townsend, Steinle and Haskell, with three units per floor. 

The Kenilworth is located within the Upper West Side-Central Park West Historic District designated by the New York City Landmarks Preservation Commission, and is a contributing property to the federally designated Central Park West Historic District. Other Beaux-Arts apartment properties in this area of the same period include The Prasada, The Langham, and The Saint Urban.

Architecture

The exterior facade of carved limestone and red brick walls is unchanged from the original construction with the exception of wood frame window replacement. Similar to The Prasada and The Lucerne, the entrance features banded columns. Featuring a mansard roof, the rooftop terrace is a common area to the residents.

Notable residents
The property was listed for sale in July 2021. 
 Basil Rathbone

References
Notes

Bibliography
 
 
 

Residential skyscrapers in Manhattan
New York City Designated Landmarks in Manhattan
Condominiums and housing cooperatives in Manhattan
Kenilworth, The
Upper West Side
Residential buildings completed in 1908
Historic district contributing properties in Manhattan